Holland is an English habitational name from Holland, a division of Lincolnshire, or any of the eight villages in various parts of England so called, from Old English hōh ‘ridge’ + land ‘land’.

Architecture and engineering
Clifford Milburn Holland, designer of the Holland Tunnel
Henry Holland, 18th-century Georgian architect
John Holland (engineer), Australian engineer and construction magnate
John Philip Holland, Irish submarine designer

Film, theatre and television
Agnieszka Holland, Polish film director
Arnie Holland, American film distribution CEO of Lightyear Entertainment
Deidre Holland, Dutch porn star
Diane Holland, British actress
George Holland, 19th century actor
Jennifer Holland, American actress
Savage Steve Holland, American animator
Steve Holland (actor), American actor and model
Sylvia Holland, American animator
Tom Holland, British actor
Willa Holland, American model and actress

Literature and linguistics
Cecelia Holland, American historical novelist
Merlin Holland (born 1945), British writer and grandson of Oscar Wilde
Norah M. Holland (1876-1925), writer
Philemon Holland, 16th/17th century English translator
Richard Holland, 15th-century Scottish writer
Thomas Holland (translator) (1539–1612), English Bible translator
Tom Holland (author) (born 1968), British author
Vyvyan Holland (1886–1967), British author, translator and son of Oscar Wilde
William Holland (diarist) (1776–1819), English diarist
Jack Holland (writer) (1947–2004), Irish journalist, novelist and poet
Patrick Holland, (born 1977) Australian writer

Music
Brian Holland, African-American songwriter and record producer
Dave Holland, British jazz bassist and composer
Dexter Holland, singer and guitarist of the American punk band the Offspring
Eddie Holland, African-American songwriter and record producer, brother of Brian and part of Holland-Dozier-Holland
Jerry Holland (fiddler), a noted Canadian fiddler 
Jolie Holland, American singer and songwriter
Jools Holland, British pianist
Luke Holland, drummer of the American metalcore band The Word Alive
Milt Holland, American jazz percussionist, drummer, musicologist and session musician in Los Angeles
W. S. Holland, American rock drummer
Will Holland, British musician, DJ and record producer

Nobility
John Holland, 1st Duke of Exeter (c. 1352 – 1400), English nobleman
John Holland, 2nd Duke of Exeter (1395–1447), English nobleman and military commander during the Hundred Years' War
Margaret Holland, (1385–1439) Duchess of Clarence, and daughter of Thomas Holland, 2nd Earl of Kent
Robert de Holland, 1st Baron Holand (1270–1328), English nobleman
Thomas Holland, 1st Earl of Kent (c. 1314 – 1360), English nobleman and military commander during the Hundred Years' War.
Thomas Holland, 2nd Earl of Kent (1350–1397), English nobleman and a councillor of his half-brother Richard II (1374–1400)
Thomas Holland, 1st Duke of Surrey (1374–1400), aka 3rd Earl of Kent

Politics
Bjorn Holland, Wisconsin state legislator
Derek Holland (activist), figure of the European far right
Elmer J. Holland, 20th century U.S. Representative
François Hollande, President of France
Harry Holland, New Zealand politician and unionist
Henry Holland, 1st Viscount Knutsford, the 19th- and 20th-century politician
Henry Holland (mayor), mayor of Christchurch, New Zealand
Iris Holland, member of the Massachusetts House of Representatives
Jack Holland (politician) (1877–1955), Australian politician
James Holland (North Carolina politician), U.S. congressman from North Carolina – 18th/19th century
Sir John Holland, 1st Baronet (1603–1701), English politician
Sir John Holland, 2nd Baronet (c. 1669–by July 1724), British politician
 John Holland, on the Los Angeles County Civil Defense and Disaster Commission in 1960s
John C. Holland (1891–1970), councilman in the Los Angeles City Council, 1943–1966
Joseph R. Holland (born 1936), New York politician
Lionel Holland (1865–1936), British politician
Mark Holland, member of the Canadian parliament
Roger Holland, Alaska politician
Samuel H. Holland, 20th-century American politician
Sidney Holland, Prime Minister of New Zealand
Spessard Holland, Governor of Florida and U.S. senator
Stuart Holland, British Labour politician and academic

Science
Sir Henry Holland, 1st Baronet, the 19th-century physician and travel writer
John Henry Holland, pioneer in genetic algorithms
John L. Holland developer of RIASEC theory
Mary E. Holland American detective and fingerprinting expert
Owen Holland, pioneer in bio-inspired robotics
Ranae Holland, American biologist and Bigfoot researcher
Thomas Henry Holland (1868–1947), British geologist
William Jacob Holland (1848–1932), zoologist, palaeontologist, and ordained Presbyterian minister

Sports
Bill Holland, racing car driver
Brad Holland, American basketball player and coach
Chester Holland, New Zealand cricketer
Derek Holland, American baseball player
Greg Holland, American baseball player
Jack Holland (boxer) (c. 1909 – 1933), American boxer, college football player
Jack Holland (footballer, born 1861) (1861–1898), English footballer
Jack Holland (rugby league), Australian rugby league footballer
James Holland (soccer), Australian soccer player
Jeff Holland, American football player
Jevon Holland (born 2000), Canadian-American football player
Joe Holland (skier), an American Nordic combined skier
Joe Holland (basketball), an American basketball player
John Holland (athlete) (1926–1990), New Zealand athlete
John Holland (baseball executive) (1910–1979), American general manager of the Chicago Cubs, 1956–1975
John Holland (basketball) (born 1988), American professional basketball player
John Holland (canoeist) (born 1952), American slalom canoer
John Holland (cricketer) (1869–1917), English cricketer
John Holland (footballer) (born 1953), Maltese international footballer
John Henry "Jack" Holland (1861–1898), English footballer
Johnny Holland (born 1965), American football player
Jon Holland (born 1987), Australian cricketer
Jonathan Holland (footballer) (born 1978), footballer for Hamrun Spartans
Jonathan Holland (American football) (born 1985), American football wide receiver
Jonathan Holland (rugby union) (born 1991), Irish rugby union player
Julian Holland (boxer), Australian boxer of the 1990s and 2000s
Kevin Holland, American Mixed Martial Artist
Matt Holland, Irish footballer
Patrick Holland (ice hockey), Canadian ice hockey player
Peter Holland (ice hockey), Canadian ice hockey player
[[Scott Holland, American Football player NU,WSU,Munich Cowboys, Marlboro Shamrocks 
Sonny Holland (1938-2022), American football coach and player
Stephen Holland, Australian Olympic swimmer
Terry Holland, American college basketball coach and administrator
Tom Holland (Australian footballer) (1885–1946), Australian footballer
Tom Holland (footballer, born 1902) (1902–1987), English footballer

Religion
Jeffrey R. Holland, LDS apostle
Thomas Holland (Jesuit) (died 1642), Catholic priest, Jesuit and martyr

Other
Cedric Holland (1889–1950), Royal Navy officer
Cyril Holland (1885–1915), son of Oscar Wilde, brother of Vyvyan Holland
Ed Holland, American editorial cartoonist
Fern Holland  (1970–2004), American lawyer  killed in the Iraq conflict
Kimberly Holland, American Playboy playmate
Lancelot Holland (1887–1941), Royal Navy officer
Wau Holland, computer hacker

See also
Holland (disambiguation)
Hollander (disambiguation) (includes Hollaender and Holländer)

English-language surnames
English toponymic surnames
Anglicised Irish-language surnames